The Palau Güell is a mansion designed by the architect Antoni Gaudí for the industrial tycoon Eusebi Güell, and was built between 1886 and 1888. It is situated on the Carrer Nou de la Rambla, in the El Raval neighborhood of Barcelona in Catalonia, Spain. It is part of the UNESCO World Heritage Site "Works of Antoni Gaudí".

The home is centered around the main room for entertaining high society guests. Guests entered the home in horse-drawn carriages through the front iron gates, which featured a parabolic arch and intricate patterns of forged ironwork resembling seaweed and in some parts a horsewhip. Animals could be taken down a ramp and kept in the livery stable in the basement where the servants resided, while the guests went up the stairs to the receiving room. The ornate walls and ceilings of the receiving room disguised small viewing windows high on the walls where the owners of the home could view their guests from the upper floor and get a "sneak peek" before greeting them, in case they needed to adjust their attire accordingly.

The main party room has a tall ceiling with small holes near the top where lanterns were hung at night from the outside to give the appearance of a starlit sky.

In 2004, visits by the public were completely suspended due to renovations; some of the stone used in the original construction was weak and had cracked over the years causing structural problems within the building. It is currently completely open, with all restoration work completed in April 2011.

It was used in Antonioni's film  The Passenger as a backdrop for the first meeting between Jack Nicholson and Maria Schneider.

See also
 List of Modernisme buildings in Barcelona

External links

 Palau Güell - Official Site
 Palau Güell - non official site
 Güell Palace:  (http://www.gaudidesigner.com/uk/palacio-guell.html)

Houses completed in 1888
Antoni Gaudí buildings
Buildings and structures in Barcelona
Tourist attractions in Barcelona
World Heritage Sites in Catalonia
Houses in Catalonia
Modernisme architecture in Barcelona
Art Nouveau houses